The 2022 Mexican League season was the 97th season in the history of the Mexican League. The league is contested by 18 teams, evenly divided in North and South zones. The season started on 21 April with the series between the defending champions Toros de Tijuana and Diablos Rojos del México and ended on 19 September with the last game of the Serie del Rey, where Leones de Yucatán defeated Sultanes de Monterrey to win the championship.

Standings

Postseason

First round

Zone Series

Championship Series

Serie del Rey

Summary

Game summaries

Game 1

Game 2

Game 3

Game 4

Game 5

Game 6

Game 7

League leaders

Milestones

Batters
Tito Polo (TIG): On 22 April, Polo hit for the cycle against the Piratas de Campeche.

Addison Russell (MVA): On 29 April, Russell hit for the cycle against the Saraperos de Saltillo.

Pitchers

No-hitters
Yoennis Yera (TAB): On 6 July, Yera threw a no-hitter, the second in the team's history, by defeating the Generales de Durango 2–0.

References

Mexican League season
Mexican League season
Mexican League seasons